Sebastian Langkamp (born 15 January 1988) is a German professional footballer who last played as a defender for Perth Glory in the Australian A-League.

His brother Matthias Langkamp is also a professional footballer.

Club career

Karlsruher SC
Langkamp made his professional debut on 1 March 2009 in a Bundesliga match against VfB Stuttgart while playing at Karlsruher SC.

On his third appearance for Karlsruher SC, an away match against Bayer Leverkusen, Langkamp scored a 50-yard sliding tackle goal which some consider to be one of the most memorable goals in Bundesliga history.

Hertha BSC
He moved to Hertha BSC from FC Augsburg to play in the 2013–14 Fußball-Bundesliga.

Werder Bremen
In January 2018, Langkamp joined Werder Bremen.

Perth Glory
Perth Glory announced that they had signed Langkamp on a two-year deal in January 2021. After overcoming injury, Mr. Langkamp made his debut for Perth Glory in a 2-0 Round 15 loss to Macarthur FC in which he conceded a penalty.

Career statistics

References

External links
 
 
 Sebastian Langkamp at KSC.de 

1988 births
Living people
Association football defenders
German footballers
Germany youth international footballers
Germany under-21 international footballers
Hamburger SV II players
FC Bayern Munich II players
Karlsruher SC II players
Karlsruher SC players
SC Preußen Münster players
FC Augsburg players
Hertha BSC players
SV Werder Bremen players
Perth Glory FC players
Bundesliga players
2. Bundesliga players
People from Speyer
Footballers from Rhineland-Palatinate